Schnurr may refer to;

Dennis Marion Schnurr American catholic prelate 
Magdalena Schnurr German ski jumper
Paula Schnurr, Canadian runner
Scott Schnurr, professional wrestler who uses the name "Scotty Mac"
 Kurt Schnurr, the real name of the fictional character Airtight from the G.I. Joe franchise